Gustav Emil Johnson (born June 20, 1995) is an American comedian, filmmaker, musician, and podcaster.

Early life
Gustav Emil Johnson was born in Grantsburg, Wisconsin, on June 20, 1995, the son of volleyball coach Debra (née Allaman) and teacher/baseball coach Pete Johnson. He is of Norwegian, Danish, and Swedish descent. He has a younger sister named Hanne and two younger brothers named Sven and Thor, all of whom have collaborated with him. In middle school, he filmed what he called "stupid sketches that kids would think are funny". He was elected governor of Badger Boys State in 2013, and graduated from Grantsburg High School in 2014. He then enrolled at the University of Wisconsin–Stout, where he earned a degree in entertainment design with a focus on digital cinema.

Career
Johnson started his YouTube channel in 2010 with his first video, "Ian's Song". He then went on to create meme videos starring himself and friends, which gradually became more popular. His first viral video was "How To Get Free Food From Subway", which has 2.4 million views as of January 2021.

Johnson has also released music on YouTube since the beginning of his career. He released the album Lighting Rods and Leaky Roofs with hometown friend Joe Dumas in 2015, and the album Champagne Seats in 2016. In 2017, Johnson made a podcast with his friend and fellow YouTuber Eddy Burback titled OK I'll Talk. The two later moved from the Midwest to Los Angeles and created a new show, The Gus & Eddy Podcast; This podcast is similar to OK I'll Talk, and occasionally features guests. In late 2017, Johnson also branched into longform comedy, using Kickstarter to raise funds for a comedy series on a run-down golf course called "Par 9".

In January 2019, Johnson received a nomination at the 11th Shorty Awards for Best YouTube Comedian. On April 10, 2019, Johnson's channel hit 1 million subscribers on YouTube during his appearance on the H3 Podcast. He celebrated with a video titled "Thank you for 1 million", in which he thanked everyone who had helped him along the way. In 2019, he signed a talent deal with Viacom to create content for Comedy Central.

Personal life
Johnson resides in Los Angeles.

Discography

Studio albums

Singles

Awards and nominations

References

External links
 
 

1995 births
American YouTubers
Comedy YouTubers
Living people
YouTube channels launched in 2010
Music YouTubers
People from Grantsburg, Wisconsin
People from Los Angeles
University of Wisconsin–Stout alumni
YouTube filmmakers
YouTube podcasters
American podcasters
American people of Swedish descent
American people of Norwegian descent